Malchin am Kummerower See is an Amt in the Mecklenburgische Seenplatte district, in Mecklenburg-Western Pomerania, Germany. It is just east of the Kummerower See. The seat of the Amt, that was formed in 2005, is in the town Malchin.

The Amt Malchin am Kummerower See consists of the following municipalities:

Basedow 
Faulenrost 
Gielow 
Kummerow 
Malchin
Neukalen

External links
(Google Maps)

Ämter in Mecklenburg-Western Pomerania
Mecklenburgische Seenplatte (district)